K+S AG (formerly Kali und Salz GmbH) is a German chemical company headquartered in Kassel. The company is Europe’s largest supplier of potash for use in fertilizer. The firm also produces and distributes other mineral fertilizers, such as those from magnesium and sulphur. K+S is mainly active in Europe, North and South America with almost 15,000 employees worldwide (2020).

History

K+S was founded in 1889 as Aktiengesellschaft für Bergbau und Tiefbohrung, was renamed to Kaliwerke Salzdetfurth AG in 1899, and was again renamed to Salzdetfurth AG in 1937. After merging with the potash division of BASF subsidiary Wintershall in 1973, the company was renamed to Kali und Salz (Kalium = potassium and Salz = salt in German). In 1999, the company was renamed K+S. From September 22, 2008 to March 21, 2016, the stock was part of German stock index DAX, consisting of the 30 major German companies trading on the Frankfurt Stock Exchange. It was excluded from the DAX because of inadequate market capitalization. K+S has expanded internationally and is represented in 22 different countries in 4 different continents. K+S is used in Europe and is found in Belgium, the Czech Republic, France, Germany, Great Britain, Italy, the Netherlands, Poland, Portugal, Russia, Spain, Sweden and Switzerland. It is found in North America in The Bahamas, Canada and the US . In South America it can be found in Brazil, Chile and Peru , China, India and Singapore in Asia, and South Africa in Africa

Subsidiaries
 K+S Potash Canada GP, based in Saskatoon, Canada 
 K+S KALI GmbH, based in Kassel, Germany 
 esco – European salt company GmbH & Co.KG, based in Hannover, Germany 
 Chemische Fabrik Kalk, based in Cologne, Germany
 K+S Transport GmbH, based in Hamburg, Germany

See also

 Morton Salt, former subsidiary of K+S
 Canadian Salt Company, former subsidiary of K+S
 Chemische Fabrik Kalk, a former subsidiary of K+S

References

External links

 
 

BASF
Chemical companies of Germany
Companies based in Kassel
German brands
Multinational companies headquartered in Germany
Chemical companies established in 1889
1889 establishments in Germany
Companies listed on the Frankfurt Stock Exchange
Companies in the MDAX